Dominique Langevin (born July 24, 1947) is a French researcher in physical chemistry. She is research director at the Centre national de la recherche scientifique and leads the liquid interface group in the Laboratory of Solid State Physics at the University of Paris-Sud.

The daughter of Maurice Cruchon and Jacqueline Maujean, she was born Dominique Anne-Marie Cruchon in Angoulême. In 1969, she married Michel Langevin.

She received a PhD from the École Normale Supérieure in Paris and conducted post-doctoral research at the Pierre Gilles de Gennes laboratory at the Collège de France.

During the 1970s, she established the surfactant group at the École Normale Supérieure. During the early 1990s, she established the "Films de tensioactifs flexibles" research group. From 1994 to 1998, Langevin was director of the Centre de Recherche Paul Pascal in Bordeaux. She was president of the European Colloid & Interface Society from 1992 to 1993.

Her areas of research have included the surface of liquid crystals, foams and foam drainage, mixtures of surfactants and polymers and soap film drainage, as well as surface rheology of ultralow tension surfactant-oil-water systems.

She has been awarded the:
 Centre national de la recherche scientifique (CNRS) silver medal
 L'Oréal-UNESCO Award for Women in Science
  of the Société Française de Physique and the Deutsche Physikalische Gesellschaft
 Kash Mittal Award for Surfactant in Solution Science
 Overbeek Gold Medal 2012 of the European Colloid & Interface Society

References 

French physical chemists
1947 births
Living people
French women chemists
L'Oréal-UNESCO Awards for Women in Science laureates
20th-century chemists
21st-century chemists
20th-century French scientists
21st-century French scientists
21st-century French chemists
20th-century French women scientists
21st-century French women scientists